Bhinga is a town, Nagar Palika and district headquarter of Shravasti district in the state of Uttar Pradesh, India.

Geography
It has an average elevation of 120 metres (393 feet).Shravasti shares its border with Balrampur district, Uttar Pradesh, Gonda district and Bahraich district and neighbouring nation Nepal. Bhinga, the district headquarters of Shravasti, is approximately 166 kilometres away from the state capital, Lucknow. Shravasti, located on the northeastern border of Uttar Pradesh, is close to River Rapti.

Demographics

As of the 2011 Census of India Bhinga had a population of 23,780. Males constitute 53% of the population and females 47%. Bhinga has an average literacy rate of 45%, lower than the national average of 59.5%; with male literacy of 53% and female literacy of 37%. 18% of the population is under 6 years of age.

References

Cities and towns in Shravasti district